The System Source Computer Museum,  located in Hunt Valley, Maryland, USA, exhibits notable computing devices from ancient times until the present. Over 5,000 objects are on display and many of the computation devices are operational. STEM activities are offered to organized tour groups. Since 2022, admission is free. The museum is open weekdays from 9:00am until 6:00pm and at other times by appointment. Docents are available to lead tours.

History
The museum's origins date to 1981 when a Baltimore ComputerLand franchise had computers in inventory that instantly became historic artifacts with the introduction of the IBM Personal Computer.

The museum was incorporated as a non-profit 501c3 in 2018 as the Maryland Technology Museum with the trade name the System Source Computer Museum. In 2021, the museum became the new home of the DigiBarn Computer Museum.

Exhibits

 Apples:  Apple 1, Apple II, Apple ///, Apple Lisa and most other Apple products 
 Cray Computer: Cray 1,  Cray 2, Cray T90   
 DEC Computers: PDP-5, PDP-8, LINC PDP-12, VAX
 Computer Memory: Delay-line memory Magnetic-core memory
 Pre-Industrial Computers:  Abacus, Quipu, Napier's bones, Slide rule
 Tic-Tac-Toe and Computers:  Charles Babbage, Relay Tic Tac Toe Machine, Matchbox Educable Noughts and Crosses Engine (MENACE) 
 Univac: UNIVAC 490 UNIVAC 418
 Xerox: Xerox Alto

STEM programs
 Hardware Workshop
 Programming a Virtual PET
 Squeak (Etoys Programming)

References

External links
 

Museums established in 1981
Museums in Baltimore County, Maryland
History museums in Maryland
Computer museums in the United States